Lieutenant General Luciano Portolano is the Chief of Staff of the Allied Joint Force Command Naples.

Biographical Information
Lieutenant General Portolano joined the Italian army in September 1981. Before joining the United Nations, he served as Deputy Chief of Staff for Joint Operations in the Italian army. He also held the positions of Commander of the Sassari Mechanized Brigade and Commander of the International Security Assistance Force. His experience with multinational operations includes work with the United Nations Assistance Mission in Afghanistan, Iraq and the former Yugoslav Republic of Macedonia. He also served in the Italian Armed Forces as the Deputy Chief of Staff for Joint Operations.
On 16 June 2014 he was named Commander of the United Nations Interim Force in Lebanon by United Nations Secretary-General Ban Ki-moon, and he ended his service in Lebanon in July 2016.

He is married and has two children.

Awards and decorations

  Two Sicilian Royal Family: Knight Grand Cross of Merit of the Order of Saint George

References

Italian officials of the United Nations
Italian military personnel
United Nations military personnel
Living people
1960 births